Invertebrates are very common vectors of disease. A vector is an organism which spreads disease from one host to another. Invertebrates spread bacterial, viral and protozoan pathogens by two main mechanisms. Either via their bite, as in the case of malaria spread by mosquitoes, or via their faeces, as in the case of Chagas' Disease spread by Triatoma bugs or epidemic typhus spread by human body lice.

Many invertebrates are responsible for transmitting diseases. Mosquitoes are perhaps the best known invertebrate vector and transmit a wide range of tropical diseases including malaria, dengue fever and yellow fever. Another large group of vectors are flies. Sandfly species transmit the disease leishmaniasis, by acting as vectors for protozoan Leishmania species, and tsetse flies transmit protozoan trypansomes (Trypanosoma brucei gambiense and Trypansoma brucei rhodesiense) which cause African Trypanosomiasis (sleeping sickness). Ticks and lice form another large group of invertebrate vectors. The bacterium Borrelia burgdorferi, which causes Lyme Disease, is transmitted by ticks and members of the bacterial genus Rickettsia are transmitted by lice. For example, the human body louse transmits the bacterium Rickettsia prowazekii which causes epidemic typhus.

Although invertebrate-transmitted diseases pose a particular threat on the continents of Africa, Asia and South America, there is one way of controlling invertebrate-borne diseases, which is by controlling the invertebrate vector. For example, one way of controlling malaria is to control the mosquito vector through the use of mosquito nets, which prevent mosquitoes from coming into contact with humans.

This is a list of diseases spread by invertebrates.

Diseases

See also 
 Arbovirus
 List of cutaneous conditions
 List of insect-borne diseases
 List of parasites (human)
 Mobovirus
 Mosquito-borne disease
 Robovirus
 Sandfly-borne disease
 Tibovirus
 Tick-borne disease

References

Insect caused
diseases spread